The Thomas J. Watson Library is the main research library of the Metropolitan Museum of Art, and supports the research activities of the museum staff, as well as outside researchers. It is located in the Met's main building, The Met Fifth Avenue.

Description
Located on the first floor of the Met, the Watson Library can be visited without appointment. At the museum, each department also maintains its own internal library, most of which have materials that are requestable online through the Watson Library catalog. The collection is a closed-shelf reference library, and materials are not available for borrowing by the general public, but may be used in a secure reading room; some items may be borrowed by Met staffers.

In addition, the Met hosts the Nolen Library on its ground floor, a collection of 10,000 items in an open-shelf, non-circulating collection intended for the general public, including children. The Nolen Library also includes a large collection of children's books, as well as specialized curriculum materials for educators.

The Watson Library's collection contains approximately 900,000 volumes, including monographs and exhibition catalogs; over 11,000 periodical titles; and more than 125,000 auction and sale catalogs. The library also includes a reference collection, a rare book collection, manuscript items, and vertical file collections. The library is accessible to anyone over 18, simply by registering online and providing a valid photo ID. Once a free account is set up, a researcher may issue reserve requests online, in advance of an on-site visit, and may also issue requests in person at the library.

The library houses several display cases which are used for temporary exhibits of books and publications from its collections. Exhibits may focus on a single artist, an artistic movement, a publication medium or style, or any other topic of interest. Items which are on exhibit are clearly flagged in the online catalog as temporarily unavailable for use.

Its committee is chaired by noted art historian Olivier Berggruen.

Digital collections
The Digital Collections seeks to digitize rare and unique materials that have not yet been digitized anywhere else on the web.

Highlights from the Digital Collections include:
Metropolitan Museum of Art publications
Rare books in the Thomas J. Watson Library Collection
Brummer Gallery Records
Costume Institute fashion plates 
Manuscripts

References

External links
Watsonline: the catalog of the libraries of The Metropolitan Museum of Art
Digital Collections from The Metropolitan Museum of Art Libraries
Thomas J. Watson Library Portal
The Metropolitan Museum of Art website

Libraries in Manhattan
Metropolitan Museum of Art
Research libraries in the United States